Duke Xiao of Qin (381–338 BC), given name Quliang, was the ruler of the Qin state from 361 to 338 BC during the Warring States period of Chinese history. Duke Xiao is best known for employing the Legalist statesman Shang Yang from the State of Wey (衛), and authorizing him to conduct a series of ground breaking political, military and economic reforms in Qin. Although the reforms were controversial and drew violent opposition from many Qin politicians, Duke Xiao supported Shang Yang fully and the reforms did help to transform Qin into a dominant superpower among the Seven Warring States.

Biography
Duke Xiao ascended to the throne of the Qin state in 361 BC at the age of 21, succeeding his father, Duke Xian. Duke Xiao was determined to restore the Qin state to its former glory as one of the Five Hegemons during the reign of his ancestor, Duke Mu. Hence, the duke sent out an announcement, calling for men of talent to aid him in strengthening Qin, promising them rewards of high offices and lands in return for their service. Wei Yang (later known as Shang Yang), a scholar from the Legalist School, responded to the duke's call as he had been unsuccessful in attempting to start his career in other states.

Wei Yang was introduced to Duke Xiao by Jing Jian and had two audiences with the duke, during which he proposed ideas on governance based on the principles of Confucianism, Taoism and other schools of thought, but the duke was not impressed. During the third meeting, Wei proposed his ideas on strict governance, based on ideas from Legalism, and captured the duke's attention. Duke Xiao and Wei Yang had a discussion that lasted for three days and three nights, after which they drafted plans for reform. The plans were put into effect in 363 BC, but several Qin politicians objected strongly to the reforms. However, Duke Xiao supported Wei Yang fully and ensured that the reforms were implemented as planned.

The reforms caused ground breaking changes in the Qin state and transformed it into a strict, controlling, militaristic state, which governed by using tough and oppressive laws. Agriculture was expanded through forced migration to new regions, and citizens were rewarded or punished based on their military or agricultural achievements.

In 366 BC, the Qin armies defeated the allied forces from the states of Han and Wei at the Battle of Shimen. The Qin soldiers and officers were promoted to higher ranks based on the number of enemy heads they collected during battle. The Qin state pushed on to seize lands from the Wei state, which managed to survive only with the help of the Zhao state, and Wei was drastically weakened by its losses and defeats.

Legacy
Duke Xiao ruled Qin for 24 years and died at the age of 44 in 338 BC. He was succeeded by his son King Huiwen of Qin. Duke Xiao was given the posthumous name of "Xiao", which means "filial". The reforms that took place during his reign helped to lay a strong foundation for Qin's eventual unification of China under the Qin Dynasty, under the leadership of Duke Xiao's descendant, Zheng, who became Qin Shi Huang (First Emperor of Qin).

Duke Xiao was also the last ruler of Qin to be addressed as "duke", as his successors titled themselves "kings". The change was an indication of the loss of authority of the central government (Zhou Dynasty), as rulers of several other feudal states had begun to call themselves "kings" instead of "dukes".

Family
Concubines:
 Lady, of Han, the mother of Prince Ji

Sons:
 Crown Prince Si (356–311 BC), ruled as King Huiwen of Qin from 338–311 BC
 Prince Ji (d. 300 BC)
 Known by his fiefdom, Master of Chuli, or by his title, Lord Yan
 Served as the Prime Minister of Qin from 306–300 BC
 Prince Hua

Ancestry

References

External links
Duke Xiao of Qin - Chinese Text Project

Rulers of Qin
4th-century BC Chinese monarchs
381 BC births
338 BC deaths
Legalism (Chinese philosophy)
Chinese reformers